Karol Piątek (born 4 July 1982 in Luzino) is a former Polish footballer who played as a midfielder.

External links 
 

1982 births
Living people
Polish footballers
Lechia Gdańsk players
MKS Cracovia (football) players
ŁKS Łódź players
Arka Gdynia players
Bruk-Bet Termalica Nieciecza players
Ekstraklasa players
People from Wejherowo County
Sportspeople from Pomeranian Voivodeship
Gryf Wejherowo players
Bytovia Bytów players
Association football midfielders